IWA World Heavyweight Championship is the name given for the principal title of a number of professional wrestling promotions that operate under the acronym "I.W.A." (despite not sharing corporate name).

It may refer to:

IWA World Heavyweight Championship (Puerto Rico), the main title of the International Wrestling Association's conglomerate in Puerto Rico (IWA-PR)
IWA World Heavyweight Championship (IWA Japan), the main title of the International Wrestling Association of Japan, which was founded by Victor Quiñones and later sold to open IWA-PR
IWA World Heavyweight Championship (International Wrestling Enterprise), the main title of the International Wrestling Enterprise of Japan
IWA World Heavyweight Championship (Australia)
International Wrestling Association (1970s)'s championship